Antero Pertti Elias Niittymäki (born June 18, 1980) is a Finnish former professional ice hockey goaltender who last played for TPS of the SM-liiga (Finnish elite league). He additionally played in the National Hockey League (NHL) with the Philadelphia Flyers, Tampa Bay Lightning and San Jose Sharks. At the 2006 Winter Olympics, while playing for Team Finland, he was voted the Most Valuable Player (MVP) of the entire ice hockey tournament.

Partway through his four-year junior career with TPS in the junior SM-liiga, Niittymäki was selected by the Flyers 168th overall in the 1998 NHL Entry Draft. He continued to play in Finland with TPS for his first year out of the junior leagues, and he won the Finnish elite league's Rookie of the Year trophy. After two more seasons with TPS, Niittymäki moved to North America to join the Philadelphia Phantoms in the American Hockey League (AHL). When the Phantoms won the AHL Calder Cup championship, he was named the MVP of the playoffs. He then played four seasons for the Philadelphia Flyers before signing as a free agent with the Tampa Bay Lightning. One year later, he signed as a free agent with the San Jose Sharks, but he did not play many games for them over the next two years due to hip injuries. He played his final season with his youth team TPS, and he announced his retirement in 2013.

Playing career

Early career
From 1995 to 2002, Niittymäki played for TPS in the SM-liiga (Finnish elite league), playing in the junior SM-liiga prior to 1999. In 2000, he won the Jarmo Wasama memorial trophy for Rookie of the Year, and led TPS to their second straight SM-liiga championship.

Niittymäki was the Philadelphia Flyers' 6th round pick (168th overall) in the 1998 NHL Entry Draft. "I didn't even know I got drafted. I found out the next morning. I was really surprised," he said in an interview in November 2003. Even if he had opted to go immediately to the United States to play hockey, compulsory military service kept Niittymäki in Finland until January 2001. He would return to TPS in 2002 for his final season, playing 14 games. 

From 2002 to 2005, Niittymäki played for the Flyers in the NHL and the Philadelphia Phantoms, the Flyers' American Hockey League affiliate. Niittymäki was successful in the AHL. He was named the Sher-Wood AHL Player of the Week for the week ending on November 23, 2003 after posting a 0.41 GAA and .984 SP. He played for PlanetUSA in the 2005 AHL All-Star Game. The Phantoms organization gave out Antero Niittymäki bobbleheads on February 27, 2005 and Niittymäki figurines on March 3, 2006.

Niittymäki scored a game-winning, empty net, overtime, shorthanded, unassisted goal on April 11, 2004 versus the Hershey Bears. The game ended 3–2, with Niittymäki recording 32 saves as well, which finished the 12–0 Philadelphia season sweep of the Bears.

The Phantoms won the Calder Cup in 2005 after sweeping the Chicago Wolves. Niittymäki received the Jack A. Butterfield Trophy for being the MVP in the Calder Cup Playoffs. He had a 1.75 GAA and 15 wins, three of which were shutouts.

NHL
Niittymäki played three games for the Flyers in February 2004. He was allowed to play after Robert Esche was injured and Jeff Hackett was forced to retire because of vertigo. He won all three games, posting a 1.00 GAA, against the Washington Capitals, Atlanta Thrashers and New Jersey Devils. His starting stint ended after the Flyers acquired Sean Burke from the Phoenix Coyotes. Upon Esche's recovery, Burke took over the backup job and Niittymäki was sent back down to the Phantoms.

Niittymäki started the 2005–06 season as the Flyers' backup goalie for Esche. On October 14, 2005, Niittymäki let in a questionable goal immediately after a faceoff on the Pittsburgh Penguins' side of center ice. He was watching a JumboTron replay when Maxime Talbot softly shot at him and scored.

While Esche was on the injury list, Niittymäki got the opportunity to start with Jamie Storr being his backup goalie. Niittymäki started seventeen consecutive games while Esche was unable to play. He recorded his first NHL shutout and assist/point during this time. He was named the NHL Defensive Player of the week for the week ending on 8 January 2006.

The 2006–07 NHL season revolved around injuries for Niittymäki. He suffered a torn labrum injury to his left hip during training camp. Doctors decided to try giving him cortisone shots to postpone surgery, which would have sidelined him for 6–8 weeks. The first shot allowed him to get back on the ice for the start of the season, but by late December he needed another shot. Despite this, he managed to take over the starting goaltender position from Esche, after Esche fell out with the coaching staff and management. However, Philadelphia acquired Martin Biron and he was given the starting position for the rest of the year. Niittymäki finally had hip surgery in summer 2008. He continued to play backup goaltender for the Flyers for the next two seasons (07–08 and 08–09), setting a franchise record for most saves in a game in January 2008.

The 2009 NHL offseason marked the first time in Niittymäki's NHL playing career that he was an unrestricted free agent. After the Philadelphia Flyers acquired goaltenders Ray Emery and Brian Boucher, Niittymäki signed with the Tampa Bay Lightning as a backup goalie for Mike Smith, however, he started many games, while Smith struggled with injuries.

Niittymäki started his 2009–2010 season with great success; after his first ten games, he led the league in both save percentage (.939) and goals against average (1.93). Niittymäki won four straight games in February 2010, something that had not occurred for Tampa Bay since two and a half years prior, when the team won five straight in the 2007–08 season (November). On March 25, 2010, Niittymäki won his 20th game in the season and the Tampa Bay Lightning's 500th franchise victory, while setting his second NHL franchise record for most saves in a game. Niittymäki extended his lifetime winning streak against the Atlanta Thrashers to 17 wins on March 6, 2010.

On the first day of free agency in summer 2010, Niittymäki was signed to replace long time San Jose Sharks goaltender Evgeni Nabokov because of salary cap considerations. Niittymäki played strongly at the beginning of the season, earning the Sharks Player of the Month award in October. However, he sustained another lower body injury, resulting in him missing 17 games, during which Antti Niemi solidified his standing as the starting goaltender. Before his second year in San Jose, Niittymäki had hip surgery. During his recovery process, he played a few games with the Sharks' AHL affiliate, the Worcester Sharks. He was ultimately loaned to the AHL's Syracuse Crunch for the rest of the season, but he only played eight games.

Post-playing career
On April 12, 2013 Niittymäki announced he was forced to retire because of recurring hip-problems. Niittymäki was hired by the Philadelphia Flyers in June 2013 as a European goaltender scout.

International play

Niittymäki was named to the Team Finland for the 2006 Winter Olympics after Kari Lehtonen and Miikka Kiprusoff had to pull out due to injuries. Despite being a relative unknown with little top-level experience, he put in a stellar performance and was named the MVP of the tournament after posting 3 shutouts in 6 games, leading Finland to the silver medal.

Niittymäki played for Finland in the 2006 IIHF World Championships until the last game of the qualifying round against Canada, in which he got injured and was replaced by the team's reserve goalie Fredrik Norrena.

In the 2010 Winter Olympics Niittymäki was selected to the team as Finland's third goalie, behind Miikka Kiprusoff and Niklas Bäckström. However he did not see any action during the tournament.

Awards
2000: Jarmo Wasama Memorial Trophy
Kanada-malja championship: TPS, 2000 and 2001
Sher-Wood AHL Player of the Week – week ending on 16 November 2003
Philadelphia Phantoms Toyota Player of the Month for January, March, November 2004
2005: Played in AHL All-Star Game
Calder Cup championship: Philadelphia Phantoms, 2005
2005: Jack A. Butterfield Trophy
2005: Phantoms All Decade Second Team
NHL Defensive Player of the Week – week ending on 8 January 2006 - shared with David Aebischer
2006 Winter Olympics men's ice hockey Most Valuable Player and member of the media All-Star team
San Jose Sharks Player of the Month for October 2010

Records

Transactions

Career statistics

Regular season and playoffs

International

Statistics source:

References

External links
 

Interviews
 E-mail the Phantoms: 
 Phun Phacts: 

Statistics
SM-liiga official website; including official statistics

1980 births
Finnish ice hockey goaltenders
HC TPS players
Ice hockey players at the 2006 Winter Olympics
Ice hockey players at the 2010 Winter Olympics
Living people
Medalists at the 2006 Winter Olympics
Medalists at the 2010 Winter Olympics
Olympic bronze medalists for Finland
Olympic ice hockey players of Finland
Olympic medalists in ice hockey
Olympic silver medalists for Finland
Sportspeople from Turku
Philadelphia Flyers draft picks
Philadelphia Flyers players
Philadelphia Flyers scouts
Philadelphia Phantoms players
San Jose Sharks players
Syracuse Crunch players
Tampa Bay Lightning players
Worcester Sharks players